RHAM High School (Regional Hebron, Andover, and Marlborough) is a regional public high school located in Hebron, Connecticut, United States.

Overview
RHAM's former team name, the Sachems, comes from the name of Native American Indian Chiefs of the Algonquin tribe. There is a 1:12 teacher to student ratio.

Athletics

Soccer
 The girls' soccer team won the 2009, 2010, 2012, 2013, and 2014 Central Connecticut Conference titles, and made it to the Connecticut semi-finals in their 2009 season.
 The boys' soccer team won the 2011, 2013, and 2014 Central Connecticut Conference titles.

Wresting
Boys wrestling placed second in 2022 Class M Connecticut State Conference after a controversial half-point deduction penalty, losing to Avon High School.

Cross country
 Girls' Cross Country won the Class M State Championship title in 1993, 1994, 1996, 1997, 2007, and 2016.

Volleyball
 Girls' volleyball won the Class L State Championship title in 2007, 2008, 2009, 2010, 2013, 2016, 2017, 2021, 2022.

Baseball
 Baseball won the Class L State Championship in 2004 behind A.J. Pollock, who was drafted by the Arizona Diamondbacks in the 2009 MLB draft.

Notable alumni
 A.J. Pollock, MLB player
 Martin Sommer, ex-substitute teacher that was charged with public indecency (not to be confused with Martin Sommer)

References

Schools in Tolland County, Connecticut
Public high schools in Connecticut
Andover, Connecticut
Hebron, Connecticut
Marlborough, Connecticut
Educational institutions established in 1956
1956 establishments in Connecticut